Topiary is the horticultural practice of training perennial plants by clipping the foliage and twigs of trees, shrubs and subshrubs to develop and maintain clearly defined shapes, whether geometric or fanciful. The term also refers to plants which have been shaped in this way. As an art form it is a type of living sculpture. The word derives from the Latin word for an ornamental landscape gardener, topiarius, a creator of topia or "places", a Greek word that Romans also applied to fictive indoor landscapes executed in fresco.

The plants used in topiary are evergreen, mostly woody, have small leaves or needles, produce dense foliage, and have compact and/or columnar (e.g., fastigiate) growth habits. Common species chosen for topiary include cultivars of European box (Buxus sempervirens), arborvitae (Thuja species), bay laurel (Laurus nobilis), holly (Ilex species), myrtle (Eugenia or Myrtus species), yew (Taxus species), and privet (Ligustrum species). Shaped wire cages are sometimes employed in modern topiary to guide untutored shears, but traditional topiary depends on patience and a steady hand; small-leaved ivy can be used to cover a cage and give the look of topiary in a few months. The hedge is a simple form of topiary used to create boundaries, walls or screens.

History

Origin

European topiary dates from Roman times. Pliny's Natural History and the epigram writer Martial both credit  Gaius Matius Calvinus, in the circle of Julius Caesar, with introducing the first topiary to Roman gardens, and Pliny the Younger describes in a letter the elaborate figures of animals, inscriptions, cyphers and obelisks in clipped greens at his Tuscan villa (Epistle v.6, to Apollinaris). Within the atrium of a Roman house or villa, a place that had formerly been quite plain, the art of the topiarius produced a miniature landscape (topos) which might employ the art of stunting trees, also mentioned, disapprovingly, by Pliny (Historia Naturalis xii.6).

Far Eastern topiary

The clipping and shaping of shrubs and trees in China and Japan have been practised with equal rigor, but for different reasons. The goal is to achieve an artful expression of the "natural" form of venerably aged pines, given character by the forces of wind and weather. Their most concentrated expressions are in the related arts of Chinese penjing and Japanese bonsai.

Japanese cloud-pruning is closest to the European art: the cloud-like forms of clipped growth are designed to be best appreciated after a fall of snow. Japanese Zen gardens (karesansui, dry rock gardens) make extensive use of Karikomi (a topiary technique of clipping shrubs and trees into large curved shapes or sculptures) and Hako-zukuri (shrubs clipped into boxes and straight lines).

Renaissance topiary
Since its European revival in the 16th century, topiary has been seen on the parterres and terraces of gardens of the European elite, as well as in simple cottage gardens; Barnabe Googe, about 1578, found that "women" (a signifier of a less than gentle class) were clipping rosemary "as in the fashion of a cart, a peacock, or such things as they fancy." In 1618 William Lawson suggested
Your gardener can frame your lesser wood to the shape of men armed in the field, ready to give battell: or swift-running Grey Houndes to chase the Deere, or hunt the Hare. This kind of hunting shall not wate your corne, nor much your coyne.
Traditional topiary forms use foliage pruned and/or trained into geometric shapes such as balls or cubes, obelisks, pyramids, cones, or tiered plates and tapering spirals. Representational forms depicting people, animals, and man-made objects have also been popular. The royal botanist John Parkinson found privet "so apt that no other can be like unto it, to be cut, lead, and drawn into what forme one will, either of beasts, birds, or men armed or otherwise." Evergreens have usually been the first choice for Early Modern topiary, however, with yew and boxwood leading other plants.

Topiary at Versailles and its imitators was never complicated: low hedges punctuated by potted trees trimmed as balls on standards, interrupted by obelisks at corners, provided the vertical features of flat-patterned parterre gardens. Sculptural forms were provided by stone and lead sculptures. In Holland, however, the fashion was established for more complicated topiary designs; this Franco-Dutch garden style spread to England after 1660, but by 1708-09 one searches in vain for fanciful topiary among the clipped hedges and edgings, and the standing cones and obelisks of the aristocratic and gentry English parterre gardens in Kip and Knyff's Britannia Illustrata.

Decline in the 18th century

In England topiary was all but killed as a fashion by the famous satiric essay on "Verdant Sculpture" that Alexander Pope published in the short-lived newspaper The Guardian, 29 September 1713, with its mock catalogue descriptions of
Adam and Eve in yew; Adam a little shattered by the fall of the tree of knowledge in the great storm; Eve and the serpent very flourishing.
The tower of Babel, not yet finished.
St George in box; his arm scarce long enough, but will be in condition to stick the dragon by next April.
A quickset hog, shot up into a porcupine, by its being forgot a week in rainy weather.

In the 1720s and 1730s, the generation of Charles Bridgeman and William Kent swept the English garden clean of its hedges, mazes, and topiary. Although topiary fell from grace in aristocratic gardens, it continued to be featured in cottagers' gardens, where a single example of traditional forms, a ball, a tree trimmed to a cone in several cleanly separated tiers, meticulously clipped and perhaps topped with a topiary peacock, might be passed on as an heirloom. Such an heirloom, but on heroic scale, was the ancient churchward yew of Harlington, west of London, immortalized in an engraved broadsheet of 1729 bearing an illustration with an enthusiastic verse encomium by its dedicated parish clerk and topiarist. formerly shaped as an obelisk on square plinth topped with a ten-foot ball surmounted by a cockerel, the Harlington Yew survives today, untonsured for the last two centuries.

Revival

The revival of topiary in English gardening parallels the revived "Jacobethan" taste in architecture; John Loudon in the 1840s was the first garden writer to express a sense of loss due to the topiary that had been removed from English gardens. The art of topiary, with enclosed garden "rooms", burst upon the English gardening public with the mature examples at Elvaston Castle, Derbyshire, which opened to public viewing in the 1850s and created a sensation: "within a few years architectural topiary was springing up all over the country (it took another 25 years before sculptural topiary began to become popular as well)". The following generation, represented by James Shirley Hibberd, rediscovered the charm of topiary specimens as part of the mystique of the "English cottage garden", which was as much invented as revived from the 1870s:

The classic statement of the British Arts and Crafts revival of topiary among roses and mixed herbaceous borders, characterised generally as "the old-fashioned garden" or the "Dutch garden" was to be found in Topiary: Garden Craftsmanship in Yew and Box by Nathaniel Lloyd (1867–1933), who had retired in middle age and taken up architectural design with the encouragement of Sir Edwin Lutyens. Lloyd's own timber-framed manor house, Great Dixter, Sussex, remains an epitome of this stylised mix of topiary with "cottagey" plantings that was practised by Gertrude Jekyll and Edwin Lutyens in a fruitful partnership. The new gardening vocabulary incorporating topiary required little expensive restructuring: "At Lyme Park, Cheshire, the garden went from being an Italian garden to being a Dutch garden without any change actually taking place on the ground," Brent Elliot noted in 2000.

Americans in England were sensitive to the renewed charms of topiary. When William Waldorf Astor bought Hever Castle, Kent, around 1906, the moat surrounding the house precluded the addition of wings for servants, guests and the servants of guests that the Astor manner required. He accordingly built an authentically styled Tudor village to accommodate the overflow, with an "Old English Garden" including buttressed hedges and free-standing topiary. In the preceding decade, expatriate Americans led by Edwin Austin Abbey created an Anglo-American society at Broadway, Worcestershire, where topiary was one of the elements of a "Cotswold" house-and-garden style soon naturalised among upper-class Americans at home. Topiary, which had featured in very few 18th-century American gardens, came into favour with the Colonial Revival gardens and the grand manner of the American Renaissance, 1880–1920. Interest in the revival and maintenance of historic gardens in the 20th century led to the replanting of the topiary maze at the Governor's Palace, Colonial Williamsburg, in the 1930s.

20th century
American portable style topiary was introduced to Disneyland around 1962. Walt Disney helped bring this new medium into being - wishing to recreate his cartoon characters throughout his theme park in the form of landscape shrubbery. This style of topiary is based on a suitably shaped steel wire frame through which the plants eventually extend as they grow. The frame, which remains as a permanent trimming guide, may be either stuffed with sphagnum moss and then planted, or placed around shrubbery. The sculpture slowly transforms into a permanent topiary as the plants fill in the frame.
This style has led to imaginative displays and festivals throughout the Disney resorts and parks, and mosaiculture (multiple types and styles of plants creating a mosaic, living sculpture) worldwide includes the impressive display at the 2008 Summer Olympics in China. Living corporate logos along roadsides, green roof softscapes and living walls that biofilter air are offshoots of this technology.

Artificial topiary is another offshoot similar to the concept of artificial Christmas trees. This topiary mimics the style of living versions and is often used to supply indoor greenery for home or office decoration. Patents are issued for the style, design, and construction methodology of different types of topiary trees.

Notable topiary displays

Australia
 Railton, Tasmania known as Railton Town of Topiary

Asia
 Mosaiculture 2006 (Shanghai, China)
It is clipped of Duranta erecta, a shrub widely used in Manipuri gardens, into a tiered shape called a sekpil or satra that honours the forest god Umang Lai.
 Royal Palace at Bang Pa-In in Thailand
 The Terrace Garden in Chandigarh, India, has topiaries in the form of animals by Narinder Kumar Sharma as an attraction for children.

Central America
 Parque Francisco Alvarado, Zarcero, Costa Rica

South America
 Tulcan Topiary Garden Cemetery, Tulcan, Ecuador

Europe
 Cliveden (Buckinghamshire, England)
 Levens Hall (Cumbria, England)
 A premier topiary garden started in the late 17th century by M. Beaumont, a French gardener who laid out the gardens of Hampton Court (which were recreated in the 1980s). Levens Hall is recognised by the Guinness Book of Records as having the oldest Topiary garden in the world. 
 Topsham railway station (Devon, England) An example of topiary lettering.
 Canons Ashby (Northamptonshire, England) A 16th-century garden revised in 1708
 Stiffkey, (Norfolk, England)
 Several informal designs including a line of elephants at Nellie's cottage and a guitar.
 Hidcote Manor Garden (Gloucestershire, England)
 Knightshayes Court (Devon, England)
Owlpen Manor (Gloucestershire, England) A late 16th-early 17th century terraced garden on a hillside, reordered in the 1720s, with "dark, secret rooms of yew" (Vita Sackville-West). 
 Great Dixter Gardens (East Sussex, England): Laid out by Nathaniel Lloyd, the author of a book on topiary, and preserved and extended by his son, the garden-writer Christopher Lloyd.
 Much Wenlock Priory, Shropshire
 Drummond Castle Gardens (Perthshire, Scotland)
 Portmeirion (Snowdonia, Wales)
 Parc des Topiares (Durbuy, Belgium)
A large topiary garden (10 000 m2) with over 250 figures.
 Château de Villandry, France
 Villa Lante (Bagnaia, Italy)
 Giardino Giusti (Verona, Italy)
 Castello Balduino (Montalto Pavese, Italy)
 Guggenheim Museum, (Bilbao, Spain): A huge sculpture of a West Highland White Terrier designed by the artist Jeff Koons, which is thought by experts and scientists to be the world's biggest topiary dog.
 The Tsubo-en Zen garden in Lelystad, Netherlands is a private modern Japanese Zen (karesansui, dry rock) garden that makes extensive use of so-called O-karikomi combined with Hako-zukuri (see above).
 Gardens of the Palace of Versailles outside Paris, France

North America

 Hunnewell Arboretum (Wellesley, Massachusetts)
140-year-old topiary garden of native white pine and arborvitae.
 Ladew Topiary Gardens (Monkton, Maryland)
 A topiary garden in Maryland established by award-winning topiary artist Harvey Ladew in the late 1930s. Located approximately halfway between the north Baltimore suburbs and the southern Pennsylvania border. Ladew's most famous topiary is a hunt, horses, riders, dogs and the fox, clearing a well-clipped hedge, the most famous single piece of classical topiary in North America.
 Topiary Garden at Longwood Gardens (Kennett Square, Pennsylvania)
 Columbus Topiary Park at Old Deaf School (Topiary Park, Columbus, Ohio)
 A public garden in downtown Columbus that features a topiary tableau of Georges Seurat's famous painting Sunday Afternoon on the Island of La Grande Jatte
 Pearl Fryar's Topiary Garden, (Bishopville, South Carolina)
 Green Animals, a topiary garden outside Providence, Rhode Island. One of the subjects of the documentary Fast, Cheap and Out of Control (1997) was George Mendonça, the topiarist at Green Animals for more than seventy years: "it's just cut and wait, cut and wait" Mendonça says in a filmed sequence.
Busch Gardens Tampa, established 1959. 365 acre property featuring large, colorful and detailed sphagnum topiary.

In popular culture 
 In the Tim Burton/Johnny Depp film Edward Scissorhands, Edward proves to have a natural gift for topiary art. Numerous creative works are shown throughout the movie.
 In the Stephen King novel The Shining, topiary animals that move when people are not looking frighten the Torrance family.
 In the children's novel The Children of Green Knowe by Lucy M. Boston, an overgrown topiary figure of Noah plays a sinister role.
 A real-life topiary artist is one of the subjects of Errol Morris's Fast, Cheap and Out of Control.

See also

 Bibliography of hedges and topiary
 History of gardening
 Tree shaping

References and sources
References

Sources
 Curtis, Charles H. and W. Gibson, The Book of Topiary (reprinted, 1985 Tuttle), 
 Lloyd, Nathaniel. Topiary: Garden Art in Yew and Box (reprinted, 2006)

Further reading
 Hadfield, Miles. Topiary and Ornamental Hedges: Their history and cultivation. London: Adam & Charles Black, 1971. 
 Francesco Pona. Il Paradiso de' Fiori overo Lo archetipo de' Giardini. Verona: Angelo Tamo, 1622.

External links

 European Boxwood and Topiary Society

Horticulture
Trees